Sergio Cortelezzi (born 9 September 1994) is a Uruguayan footballer who plays for Bellinzona in the Swiss Challenge League.

Career
Born in Florida, Uruguay, Cortelezzi came from the youth system of Nacional. He played in all categories and was top scorer in each of them. On 21 January 2011, he made his debut with the first team, on a summer friendly match against local rivals Peñarol, entering and scoring a goal. It was a dream debut for him. However, he never played an official match with the first team.

In early 2013, after finishing his contract with Nacional, he emigrated to Italy to play for U.S. Lecce.

In December 2013, after not having chances with the first team, he was sent to Serie D side Clodiense S.S.D.  He played ten matches and scored four goals.

In August 2014, he was transferred to Swiss Challenge League side FC Lugano.

On 25 June 2015, he signed a new deal with FC Chiasso.

In August 2016, he stayed in Switzerland and signed a new deal with Le Mont LS.

On 27 August 2021, he returned to Bellinzona.

References

External links
 
 

1994 births
Living people
People from Florida Department
Uruguayan footballers
Uruguay youth international footballers
Uruguayan expatriate footballers
Club Nacional de Football players
U.S. Lecce players
FC Lugano players
FC Chiasso players
FC Le Mont players
FC Wil players
AC Bellinzona players
Swiss Challenge League players
Swiss Promotion League players
Uruguayan expatriate sportspeople in Switzerland
Uruguayan expatriate sportspeople in Italy
Expatriate footballers in Switzerland
Expatriate footballers in Italy
Association football forwards